Manuel Bravo may refer to:

 Manuel Bravo (footballer, 1897–1974), Chilean football forward
 Manuel Bravo (footballer, born 1993), Chilean football left-back

See also
 Manuela Bravo (born 1957), Portuguese singer